Haunsbhavi  is a village in the southern state of Karnataka, India. It is located in the Hirekerur taluk of Haveri district in Karnataka. It is an educational hub and a land famous for freedom fighters. Few notable people from this village took participation in the freedom struggle and have made this village famous. One of the most famous person who made Haunsbhavi as his home was Shivappa Nesvi.

Educational institutes

 Durgad High School
 NMD Girls School
 MASC PU College
 MASC College
 Rural Polytechnic

 Swami Vivekananda school
 Sri someshwara English medium school

Notable names
Shivappa Nesvi: Was a  freedom fighter and a follower of Subash Chandra Bose, he was also known as Kranthiveer Shivanna locally. He left his education in medicine during the forties and joined the quit India movement and fought for the freedom of the country. Being a follower of Bose he joined a group of freedom fighters and fought against the British. The then Majesty's empire had a reward placed on his head for 500 Rs which was a big sum at that time. After the independence he finished his doctorate and dedicated his life treating the poor.

Demographics
 India census, Haunsabhavi had a population of 5771 with 2931 males and 2840 females.

See also
 Haveri
 Districts of Karnataka

References

External links
 http://Haveri.nic.in/

Villages in Haveri district